Mohamed Muruli (13 July 1947 – 1995) was a Ugandan boxer. He was born in Kichwamba, Kabarole District, Uganda, and died in 1995 in Fort Portal in Kabarole District. Muruli competed at the 1968 Summer Olympics in Mexico City, where he reached the quarterfinal in the lightweight class, and in the 1972 Summer Olympics in Munich, as a light welterweight.

References

1947 births
1995 deaths
Ugandan Muslims
Light-welterweight boxers
Welterweight boxers
People from Eastern Region, Uganda
Olympic boxers of Uganda
Boxers at the 1968 Summer Olympics
Boxers at the 1972 Summer Olympics
Boxers at the 1970 British Commonwealth Games
Boxers at the 1974 British Commonwealth Games
Commonwealth Games gold medallists for Uganda
Ugandan male boxers
Commonwealth Games medallists in boxing
Medallists at the 1974 British Commonwealth Games